XHWX-TDT is a television station in Monterrey, Nuevo León and Saltillo, Coahuila. Broadcasting on digital channel 19 in both cities, XHWX is a transmitter of the Azteca Uno network and the key station in the TV Azteca Noreste regional system, which provides regional news and sports content to Azteca's stations throughout northeastern Mexico.

History 
The first XHWX concession was awarded in 1980 to Corporación Mexicana de Radio y Televisión (the Mexican government's Canal 13 network). The original concession called for a station on channel 22 (later occupied by XHMOY-TV), but the station was allowed to slot into channel 4 when XEFB-TV was moved to channel 2.

Digital television

Analog shutdown 
On September 24, 2015, XHWX shut off its analog signal; its digital signal remained on UHF channel 39. The digital signal will eventually move to post-transition channel 17 as part of the program to clear channels 38-51 fowill be removed from broadcasting use. It added the "-TDT" suffix as a result of the transition.

National re-numbering scheme 
On October 25, 2016, XHWX-TDT changed its virtual channel from 4 to 1 as part of the national re-numbering scheme, in which Azteca 13 transmitters received virtual channel 1 (this ultimately prompted the network to be renamed on January 1, 2018). XEFB took over virtual channel 4.

Repeaters

XHWX-TDT is repeated on nine transmitters in Nuevo León and Coahuila:

|-

|-

|-

|-

|-

|-

|-

|-

|}

References

Azteca Uno transmitters
Television stations in Monterrey